Kitsap Memorial State Park is a  public recreation area located on Hood Canal,  north of Poulsbo in Kitsap County, Washington. The state park offers  of shoreline and activities that include picnicking, camping, hiking, scuba diving, fishing, swimming, clamming, crabbing, beachcombing, birdwatching, and field sports.

References

External links
Kitsap Memorial State Park Washington State Parks and Recreation Commission
Kitsap Memorial State Park Map Washington State Parks and Recreation Commission

State parks of Washington (state)
Parks in Kitsap County, Washington
Protected areas established in 1949
1949 establishments in Washington (state)